Once Upon a Dream is the fourth studio album by rock band The Rascals, released February 19, 1968. The album rose to number 9 on the Billboard Top LPs chart and number 7 on the R&B chart.

History
Once Upon a Dream was the band's first album billed as "The Rascals"; they had, for legal reasons, been known as "The Young Rascals" until this time.  It was also the last Rascals album to be available in both mono and stereo mixes.

The album was received differently by fans and critics. Many consider this album to be the band's best work, while others insist that it was too different from their traditionally rhythm and blues influenced music. Lead vocals came from both Eddie Brigati and Felix Cavaliere, as well as from Eddie's brother and unofficial band member David Brigati (on "Finale: Once Upon a Dream") and Gene Cornish on his own number, "I'm Gonna Love You."

In an interview with Melody Maker in 1967, Cavaliere stated, "Our new album, and I say this in a humble way, will be Sgt. Pepperish." The album uses frequent sound effects and spoken words between the songs.

A single of "It's Wonderful" (credited to "The Young Rascals," the band's last recording to be so billed) was issued November 27, 1967 and peaked at number 20 on the Billboard Hot 100 chart. The single version ends with a 50-second coda of "Mardi Gras"-style special effects and party sounds that were not included in the album version.

The album was reissued on CD August 28, 2007 by Collectors' Choice Music.

Reception

In his review for Allmusic, music critic Thom Jurek, who highly praised the album, noted the influence of Sgt. Pepper's Lonely Hearts Club Band and wrote the Rascals "put their own spin on it by adding their trademark blue-eyed soul and jazz influences to the mix of psychedelia... All details aside, though, a listen to this platter is startling. Its sophisticated orchestral and vocal arrangements are remarkable even in the 21st century... It's an under-celebrated masterpiece of the psychedelic era and belongs next to Pet Sounds and Sgt. Pepper's on the shelf because it is easily as sophisticated, and once heard in its entirety, can never be forgotten."

Track listing
All songs are written by Felix Cavaliere and Eddie Brigati, except where otherwise indicated.

Side One
 "Intro: Easy Rollin'" – 3:14
 "Rainy Day" – 3:39
 "Please Love Me" – 2:03
 "Sound Effect"
 "It's Wonderful" – 3:24
 "I'm Gonna Love You" (Gene Cornish) – 2:33
 "Dave & Eddie"
 "My Hawaii" – 4:13

Side Two
 "My World" – 2:54
 "Silly Girl" – 2:42
 "Singin' The Blues Too Long" – 5:10
 "Bells"
 "Sattva" – 4:23
 "(Finale): Once Upon a Dream" – 3:53

Personnel

The Rascals
 Felix Cavaliere – vocals, keyboards, sitar
 Eddie Brigati – vocals, percussion, tamboura
 Gene Cornish – vocals, guitar
 Dino Danelli – drums, tabla

Additional musicians
 David Brigati – vocals
Chuck Rainey – bass
Ron Carter – bass
Richard Davis – bass
King Curtis – tenor saxophone
Hubert Laws – flute
Melvin Lastie – trumpet
Buddy Lucas – harmonica
Steve Marcus – soprano saxophone

Production
Arif Mardin – producer, arranger, conductor
Gene Orloff – strings
Tom Dowd – engineer
Joe Atkinson – mastering
Phil Iehle – mastering
Bill Inglot – mastering
Dave Schultz – mastering
Jean Ristori – mastering
Adrian Barber – sound effects
Andree Buchler – coordination
Thierry Amsallem – coordination
Dino Danelli – cover sculpture, design
Mark Roth – photography
Urs Tschuppert – design
Richie Unterberger – reissue liner notes

References

1968 albums
Atlantic Records albums
The Rascals albums
Albums arranged by Arif Mardin
Albums produced by Arif Mardin